Livan-e Gharbi (also Romanized as Līvān-e Gharbī and Līvān Gharbī; also known as Līvān and Lītvān) is a village in Livan Rural District, Now Kandeh District, Bandar-e Gaz County, Golestan Province, Iran. At the 2006 census, its population was 1,496, in 398 families.

References 

Populated places in Bandar-e Gaz County